The Sheikhdom of al-Irqa (Arabic: Mashyakhat al-Irqa) was a city-state which was part of the Protectorate of South Arabia, and existed from the 19th century to 1951.

History 
The Sheikhdom was established in the 19th century.

Starting in 1888, the Shaikh of Irqa received a stipend from the British Empire. A Protectorate Treaty was concluded with him in that year on 27 April, and was ratified on 26 February 1890.

Shaikh Awadh bin Muhammad ba Das died in January 1901. He was succeeded by Shaikh Ahmed bin Awadh bin Muhammad ba Das. A new Protectorate Treaty was concluded with the latter in January 1902, when his stipend was increased from 80 to 180 dollars.

Shaikh Ahmed bin Awadh ba Das died on 21 October 1935. His grandson, Ahmad ibn `Abd Allah ibn `Abd Allah ibn `Awad Ba Das, was elected as his successor the following day.

In , Irqa was incorporated into Wahidi Balhaf.

Rulers 
The rulers of al-`Irqa bore the title Shaykh al-`Irqa.

Sheiks 
`Awad ibn Muhammad Ba Das, bef. 27 April 1888 – 2 January 1901

Ahmad ibn `Awad Ba Das, 1901 – 21 October 1935

Ahmad ibn `Abd Allah ibn `Abd Allah ibn `Awad Ba Das, 22 October 1935 – 1951

Demographics 
In 1946, the Sheikhdom of al-`Irqa had a population of 500.

Geography 
A report in 1946 described al-`Irqa as a "small fishing village".

References 

States and territories established in the 19th century
States and territories disestablished in 1951
Former monarchies of South Asia
History of Yemen
City-states